Nicholas Lee Wiley (born July 17, 1962), known as The Syracuse Serial Killer, is an American serial killer and sex offender who killed at least three women in Syracuse, New York between April and May 2004. After his arrest, he confessed to a total of seven murders to which have never been confirmed. For his known crimes, he was sentenced to life imprisonment without parole.

Early life 
Little is known about Wiley's background. He was born on July 17, 1962 and had his first run in with the law in 1979. In 1983, he was accused of striking an elderly woman with a claw hammer, a crime for which he was sentenced, but was later given a sentence reduction, and was released sometime before 1990. In 1991, he was convicted for sexually assaulting and beating a 16-year-old girl. He was sentenced for this crime and was released from prison in January 2004, and registered as a high-risk Level 3 sex offender.

Murders 
Four months after Wiley's release, 17-year-old Tammy Passineau, a 5'3" single mother, disappeared in Syracuse. She was last seen with a friend on April 11 in the 100 block of west Water Street. Passineau was a known drifter so she was not immediately reported missing until the following month when her family became worried. During the investigation, police were unable to locate her whereabouts, and foul play became a suspected factor.

On May 31, 2004, 31-year-old Lottie Thompson, a mother of three, was found stabbed to death in her apartment in Syracuse. She lived in the same West Onondaga Street building where Wiley was living at the time. The next day, on June 1, the body of 22-year-old Hannah Finnerty was discovered inside a trash can outside of the building, the cause of death was due to numerous stab wounds.

Arrest 
The next day, after Finnerty's body was found, Wiley was arrested as a suspect. After his arrest, Wiley confessed to the a total of seven murders between April and May. He claimed he had murdered four women, two men, and a teenage gang member. His claims were investigated, but no evidence could be found to support his statement, and authorities discounted his confessions.

One lead that detectives suspected was that Wiley described killing a red-haired girl named Tammy in April and, when looking at older cases, it matched with a description of Passineau. Officials turned their focus on Wiley's apartment and searched through it, and found a boxcutter which contained blood that was later matched to Passineau's DNA.

Trial and imprisonment 
In the killing of Passineau, Wiley said he had become enraged after a conversation about sexual predators and prison, which caused him to snap and slash Passineau's throat. He also claimed that he had killed Thompson in a fit of anger while having sex in her apartment, which resulted in him slitting her throat. Wiley stated that he killed his final victim, Finnerty, after he had become upset after she had bargained him more crack cocaine. Wiley ended his confession by stated he felt like a ninja during his murders.

During the trial, Wiley's defense attempted to sway the jury that Wiley, a mentally sick and twisted individual, was coerced to confess. The defense also tried to drop a first-degree murder charge due to the killings not fitting the profile, but the judge pointed out a 1995 ruling which had met the term. The six men and six women jury found Wiley guilty of three counts of first degree murder and three counts of second degree murder. Days later, he was sentenced to life imprisonment. Wiley attempted to appeal his sentences in 2009, but the convictions were all upheld.

See also 
 List of serial killers in the United States

External links 
 New York State Department of Corrections and Community Supervision Inmate Information

References 

1962 births
21st-century American criminals
American people convicted of assault
American male criminals
American people convicted of murder
American people convicted of rape
American rapists
American serial killers
Criminals from New York (state)
Living people
Male serial killers
People convicted of murder by New York (state)
People from Syracuse, New York
Prisoners sentenced to life imprisonment by New York (state)